The Mughal Harem is a book by historian K.S. Lal published in 1988 about the Mughal Harem. Scholars perceive the work as communal propaganda, intended to exoticize the harem.

Contents 
Based on contemporary sources, Lal studies queens, princesses, dancing girls, and slaves who belonged to Mughal harem from 15th to 18th century. The political roles of Nur Jahan, Jahanara and Roshanara are described in detail.

Reception 
A. Jan Qaiser of Aligarh Muslim University was very dismissive of the book. Ruby Lal noted Lal's work to be one of the few academic accounts on the topic but laden with oriental tropes of sexuality and seclusion. Karuna Sharma shared Ruby Lal's concerns; K. S. Lal's was the first comprehensive study of the subject but it exoticized the Harem and failed to account for members, who did not have any sexual role. Gianna Carotenuto found the work to be laced with "salacious tales and the sexy exploits of mythic heroes and heroines"; Lal's approach was intended to reinforce the oriental reputation of harem as a haven of sexual extremes and intrigues, and his laments about the evils of Harem being siphoned onto the society were reflective of personal and political agendas. 

Indrani Chatterjee remarked of Lal to have treated of Muslims as a "hermetically sealed" category, thereby producing a communalised historiography in pursuit of a political agenda. Harbans Mukhia found Lal's account descriptive but stereotypical. In a review of another work of Lal for the Bulletin of the School of Oriental & African Studies, A. A. Powell noted his conclusion about the Mughals being responsible for religious persecution and socioeconomic exploitation of Hindus to have been in tune with his recent publications including The Mughal Harem. Irfan Habib concured with the assessment of Chatterjee and Powell.

References

Mughal Harem
1988 non-fiction books
Books by K. S. Lal